Tyne may refer to:


Geography
River Tyne, England
Port of Tyne, the commercial docks in and around the River Tyne in Tyne and Wear, England
River Tyne, Scotland
River Tyne, a tributary of the South Esk River, Tasmania, Australia

People
Edward Tyne, New Zealand rugby footballer
George Tyne, stage name of American actor and television director Martin Yarus (1917–2008)
Tyne Daly (born 1946), American actress
Tyne O'Connell (born 1960), British author

Transportation
Tyne (1807 ship), initially a West Indiaman
Tyne, a New Zealand Company ship that arrived in Wellington in 1841
Rolls-Royce Tyne, a turboprop engine developed in the 1950s
Tyne, a sea area in the British Shipping Forecast
Tyne-class lifeboats have been operated by the Royal National Lifeboat Institution since 1982

Other uses
, vessels of the British Royal Navy
Reilly Tyne, Marvel Comics superhero Darkdevil

See also 
Tyne Limestone, a geologic formation in Scotland
Josselyn Van Tyne (1902–1957), American ornithologist and museum curator
Tynecastle Stadium
Tine (disambiguation)
Tyne Valley (disambiguation)